A Pigeon Sat on a Branch Reflecting on Existence is a 2014 internationally co-produced black comedy-drama film written and directed by Roy Andersson. It is the third installment in his "Living" trilogy, following Songs from the Second Floor (2000) and You, the Living (2007). It premiered at the 71st Venice International Film Festival where it was awarded the Golden Lion for Best Film. It was selected as the Swedish entry for the Best Foreign Language Film at the 88th Academy Awards but it was not nominated.

Its title is a reference to the 1565 painting The Hunters in the Snow by Pieter Bruegel the Elder. The painting depicts a rural wintertime scene, with some birds perched on tree branches. Andersson said he imagined that the birds in the scene are watching the people below, wondering what they are doing. He explained the title of the film as a "different way of saying 'what are we actually doing', that's what the movie is about." At the Venice Film Festival, Andersson said that the film had been inspired by the 1948 Italian film Bicycle Thieves by Vittorio De Sica.

Plot 

The slow cinema movie, hyper reality, consists of a series of mostly self-contained tableaux, sometimes connected by recurring themes or characters. The story loosely follows two traveling novelty salesmen, Jonathan and Sam, who live in a desolate flophouse, and their unsuccessful attempts to win customers for their joke articles (vampire teeth, laughing bags and a monster mask). Although there is no main storyline in the traditional sense, all scenes are connected.

Cast 
 Holger Andersson as Jonathan
 Nils Westblom as Sam

Reception
A Pigeon Sat on a Branch Reflecting on Existence received an 89% "Certified Fresh" rating on Rotten Tomatoes, based on 98 reviews, with an average rating of 7.83/10. The consensus reads: "Expertly assembled and indelibly original, A Pigeon Sat on a Branch concludes writer-director Roy Andersson's Living trilogy in style." The film also received a score of 81 out of 100 on Metacritic, based on 23 reviews, indicating "universal acclaim". Audiences surveyed by CinemaScore gave the film an average grade of "A–" on an A+ to F scale.

See also
 List of submissions to the 88th Academy Awards for Best Foreign Language Film
 List of Swedish submissions for the Academy Award for Best Foreign Language Film

References

External links

A Pigeon Sat On A Branch Reflecting on Existence on kinocritics.com

2014 films
2014 black comedy films
Films directed by Roy Andersson
Golden Lion winners
European Film Awards winners (films)
Cultural depictions of Charles XII of Sweden
Swedish avant-garde and experimental films
Swedish black comedy films
Swedish drama films
Non-narrative films
2010s avant-garde and experimental films
2014 drama films
2010s Swedish films